Gökçeyaka is a quarter of the town Gömü, Emirdağ District, Afyonkarahisar Province, Turkey. Its population is 87 (2021).

References

Populated places in Emirdağ District